The Wills Brothers, also known as W. J. & T. Wills, consisting of William John (born  in Islington, London) and Thomas Wills (born  in St Pancras, London) were a firm of sculptor brothers who were noted for their sculpture and modelling work between 1857 and 1895.

Annual exhibitors at the Royal Academy until 1884, they were best known for their designs of drinking fountains, and were employed by the Metropolitan Free Drinking Fountain Association and Coalbrookdale Company. They were noted for their cast iron work in particular, made by the Coalbrookdale Company.

In 1859 they were commissioned to design the "People's Fountain" for the Bolton Metropolitan Borough Council, costing £114 in total (of which £80 was for the sculpture) and completed in 1860. In 1978 the statue was vandalised beyond repair; it was replaced on the pedestal with an inferior statue of a woman pouring water from a jug.

The brothers were also well known for their statues of notable figures. Notable works include Richard Cobden in Camden (1866–1868), Sir Humphry Davy in Penzance (1872), Lord Mayo in Cockermouth (1875), George Leach Ashworth in Rochdale (1877), Sir Thomas White in Coventry (1883), Henry Edwards in Weymouth (1886) and William III at Brixham, Torbay (1889).

References

External links
 

English male sculptors
19th-century English male artists
19th-century British sculptors
Sculptors from London